The 6th Reconnaissance Squadron, now known as the 6th Attack Squadron, is a United States Air Force unit.

6th Reconnaissance Squadron may also refer to:
  6th Reconnaissance Squadron (Medium), U.S. Army Air Force, January 1941 – April 1942
 6th Photographic Reconnaissance Squadron
 6th Strategic Reconnaissance Squadron

See also 
 6th Squadron (disambiguation)